Yūki Munehiro (結城宗広) (1266 – January 1, 1339)

He was a Kamakura Period military figure who defended the Southern Court during the Nanboku-chō period.

He is enshrined at Yūki Shrine in Tsu, Mie Prefecture.

His son however, Yuki Chikatomo, remained neutral, preventing Chikafusa from advancing north at Shirakawa. By July 1342, Chikatomo has allied himself with Takauji.

References

1266 births
1339 deaths
People of Kamakura-period Japan
Yūki clan